Col San Giovanni is a frazione (and a parish)  of the municipality of Viù, in Piedmont, northern Italy.

Name 
In former times the village was named Collis ad sancti Joannis or Collo di San Giovanni.

History

Col San Giovanni was first mentioned in a document signed in 1011 by Landolfo, archbishop of Turin.

Since 1927 it was a separate comune (municipality).

Relevant buildings 
The local church was built from 1614 on the site of a previous one and it was renovated in 1922 to allow the transit of a new road. Its bell tower is the oldest of the Lanzo Valleys and was built at the end of the 11th century.

References

External links

Frazioni of the Province of Turin
Former municipalities of the Province of Turin